Only King Forever is the third live album from Elevation Worship recorded at Elevation Blakeney. Essential Worship released the album on January 14, 2014. They worked with Mack Brock, in the production of this album.

Critical reception

David Jeffries, giving the album four stars from AllMusic, states, "with the live set running just under 80 minutes with every epic allowed plenty of room to stretch, this is Elevation's best to date, winning in both the categories of quality and quantity." Awarding the album three stars at Worship Leader, Jeremy Armstrong, describes, "the most consistent, high quality, congregational music in the American sonic landscape." Dawn Teresa, rating the album three and a half stars by New Release Today, says, "With Only King Forever, Elevation Worship presents a packed-full record...Elevation Worship ultimately falls just short of lifting off." Indicating in a four and a half star review by Louder Than the Music, Jono Davies writes, "most importantly, this release leads you to Jesus."

Awards and accolades
This album was No. 14 on the Worship Leader'''s Top 20 Albums of 2014 list.

The song, "Only King Forever", was No. 5 on the Worship Leader'''s Top 20 Songs of 2014 list.

Track listing

Chart performance

References

2014 live albums
Elevation Worship albums